Otto Kalvitsa (21 November 1888 – 7 March 1930) was a Finnish-born Soviet aviator and a polar explorer. He is known as one of the pioneers of the Soviet Arctic aviation.

Life

Early years 
Otto Kalvitsa was born as a carpenter's son in the village of Kontiolahti, Northern Karelia. After finishing the elementary school, Kalvitsa entered the industrial school in Helsinki on his father's expense. Kalvitsa also took some drawing lessons in the Academy of Fine Arts. In 1903, Kalvitsa left the industrial school and started working for Hietalahti Shipyard and Engineering Works to finance his studies. In 1907–1912, Kalvitsa sailed on the ships of the Finland Steamship Company and finally finished his studies in 1913, graduating as a steam engine operator. The next four years, Kalvitsa worked in the steam liners of the lake Päijänne. He was active in the labour movement since the 1905 general strike, and also participated the strike supporting the 1906 Sveaborg Rebellion.

Finnish Civil War 
As the Finnish Civil War broke out in January 1918, Kalvitsa lived in Lahti. He joined the local Red Guard and was sent to Heinola, where he first served in gun repair and was later named as the "fleet commissar". In the late April, Kalvitsa joined fleeing Reds and finally ended up in the coastal town of Kotka. On 4 May, he was evacuated to Saint Petersburg by a steam ship. After a month in the Buy refugee camp in the Kostroma Governorate, Kalvitsa and three other Reds returned to Saint Petersburg. They were appointed by the Finnish revolutionaries Eino Rahja and Evert Eloranta to sneak into Finland as spies. After crossing the border on 2 August, they were soon captured by Finnish Whites in Antrea, where one of the men was killed in a gunfight. Kalvitsa was sentenced for 10 years in prison, but in January 1919, he managed to escape from the forced labour camp in Vyborg and fled to Russia.

Pilot in the Soviet Union 
Back in Saint Petersburg, Kalvitsa joined the Petrograd Red Officer School but was soon transferred to the Naval School of Aviation in Samara. Graduating in 1920, Kalvitsa became one of the nine Finnish pilots who served the Baltic Fleet Air Force in the Russian Civil War. In March 1921, he took part on the suppression of the Kronstadt rebellion and also fought against the Finnish Whites in the 1921–1922 East Karelian uprising.

In May 1923, Kalvitsa was badly injured in a plane crash, but returned to service. In August 1925, Kalvitsa made his first arctic flight as he flew with the Russian pilot Boris Chudnovsky from Leningrad via Arkhangelsk to Novaya Zemlya. The mission was to survey ship routes for the Northeast passage. Kalvitsa and Chudnovsky were particularly exploring the waters of Matochkin Strait between the Severny and Yuzhny Islands of Novaya Zemlya. In June 1926, Kalvitsa participated Georgy Ushakov's expedition to the Wrangel Island in order to survey the island for a location for the first Soviet colony.

In 1927, Kalvitsa left the Navy and joined the civil aviation organization Dobrolyot, the precursor of Aeroflot. He flew the route between Ulan-Ude and the Mongolian capital Ulan Bator. A year later, Kalvitsa was transferred to Irkutsk where he earned the nickname ″Wolf of the North″, due to his skillful flying in extreme weather conditions. In the summer of 1929, Kalvitsa explored the Arctic Sea coastline in the Chukchi Peninsula and Yakutia. The three-week journey also included a visit to the newly established colony in the Wrangel Island. Kalvitsa flew a German Junkers F 13 with the Hungarian revolutionary Franz Leonhardt as his co-pilot. The journey finally ended on 19 August as Kalvitsa landed the severely damaged plane in Bulun.

Death 
On 5 March 1930, Kalvitsa was ordered to fly medical supplies to Bulun for Cheka officers who were injured in an occurring uprising. Two days later, Kalvitsa took off from Yakutsk with the intention of flying to Bulan via Zhigansk, but in a heavy snow storm his Junkers W 33 crashed to the ice of the Lena River near the village of Sangar. Kalvitsa, Franz Leonhardt and the Russian radio-operator S. S. Karchevsky died.

Commemoration 
Kalvitsa and Leonhardt were buried in the mass grave of the revolutionary heroes in the Jerusalem Cemetery in Irkutsk. Their memorial is composed of an aircraft propeller attached to a standing stone. Another memorial was later erected near the crash site.

The village of Kalvitsa in the Sakha Republic and the bay Zaliv Kalvitsa in Novaya Zemlya are named after him.

Memoir 
Kalvitsa's memoir Jäämerilentäjän päiväkirjasta (″From the Diary of an Arctic Pilot″) was published posthumously in 1930. The book was edited by Finnish socialists Santeri Mäkelä and Ragnar Rusko. It was also published in the United States by Finnish-American socialists.

References 

1888 births
1930 deaths
People from Kontiolahti
People from Kuopio Province (Grand Duchy of Finland)
People of the Finnish Civil War (Red side)
Finnish emigrants to the Soviet Union
Soviet military personnel of the Russian Civil War
Soviet aviators
Finnish aviators
Naval aviators
Russian and Soviet polar explorers
Aviators killed in aviation accidents or incidents
Recipients of the Order of the Red Banner
Victims of aviation accidents or incidents in 1930
Victims of aviation accidents or incidents in the Soviet Union